Laura Berlin (born 13 March 1990) is a German actress and model. She is known for her role as Emma of Normandy in the Netflix original series Vikings: Valhalla, which premiered in 2022.

Career
At the age of 15, Laura Berlin was discovered by a model agency and became a model. Two years later she joined VIVA Models and took part to fashion shows for Boss, Balenciaga, Michalsky, and Fornarina. Meanwhile, she worked for IMG Models and was regularly invited to Paris and Milan. At the age of 17, she was featured on the front page of the Italian edition of Elle. She went on to be featured in other fashion magazines. Since her graduation in 2009, she has worked full-time as a model and has been signed with several famous model agencies from around the world.

After she gained her initial acting experience from school theatre and private acting lessons, she made her first television appearance at the age of 19 as the main character in Thomas Freundner's fairytale film Schneewittchen (ARD) alongside well-known actors like Sonja Kirchberger, Jaecki Schwarz, Martin Brambach, and Jörg Schüttauf. Collaboration with acting management agencies led to further film projects. Berlin appeared in several advertising spots of well-known brands as well as in a music video of the rock band Oomph!. In 2016, she played the main role in the music video of Prinz Pi's song . Moreover, she played the role of a bewildered ghost girl as a guest star in the series Binny and the Ghost.

Since December 2016, she has appeared as Jenny Hülshoff in the Internet series  published on YouTube.

Most recently, she stars as the unshakeable leader, Queen Emma in the new series "Vikings: Valhalla" directed by Jeb Stuart, airing on Netflix.

Filmography

Film

Television

Web

Music videos

References

External links

 
 Laura Berlin at filmportal.de 
 Laura Berlin profile page, acting agency Spielkind
 
 Laura Berlin's official website 

Living people
1990 births
21st-century German actresses
Actresses from Berlin
German film actresses
German television actresses
Models from Berlin